Alberto Jiménez Monteagudo (born 27 September 1974) is a retired Spanish footballer who played as a defensive midfielder, and a manager. 

He amassed Segunda División totals of 197 matches and seven goals over the course of ten seasons, representing seven different clubs, aside from nine appearances in La Liga with Albacete.

Playing career
Born in Valdeganga, Albacete, Castile-La Mancha, Monteagudo was an Albacete Balompié youth graduate. On 22 October 1992, aged just 18, he made his first-team debut by coming on as a half-time substitute for Juan Antonio Chesa in a 5–1 home routing of Utebo FC, for the season's Copa del Rey.

Monteagudo made his La Liga debut on 16 October 1994, starting in a 2–3 away loss against Sporting de Gijón. In January 1995, after being rarely used, he moved to Segunda División B side CD Corralejo on loan until June.

Upon returning, Monteagudo again featured sparingly before signing a permanent contract with CE L'Hospitalet in January 1996, with the side also in the third division. He subsequently represented CD Manchego and Recreativo de Huelva in the same level, achieving promotion to Segunda División with the latter in 1998.

Monteagudo scored his first professional goal on 30 January 1999, netting the opener in a 1–1 home draw against SD Compostela for the second division championship. In July, he moved to fellow league team CP Mérida, appearing sparingly during his one-season spell and leaving the club the following summer as it folded.

Monteagudo subsequently resumed his career in the second level, representing Real Murcia, UD Las Palmas (two stints), Algeciras CF, Xerez CD and CD Numancia. On 31 January 2008, aged already 33, he moved to UD Vecindario in the third tier, featuring regularly before moving to fellow league side Lucena CF in July, and retiring the following March.

Managerial career
Immediately after retiring Monteagudo was named manager of Lucena, for the final eight matches of the season. He managed to avoid relegation by achieving nine points out of 24, and took the club to a sixth position in 2009–10.

On 5 July 2010, Monteagudo was named manager of Cultural y Deportiva Leonesa, also in the third division. Roughly one year later, after suffering administrative relegation, he left the club.

Monteagudo was hired by CD Badajoz on 10 April 2012, but left in July after suffering another drop. On 18 July, he was named at the helm of Cádiz CF, but was sacked on 19 November after gaining 16 points from the first 13 games of the season.

On 4 June 2013, Monteagudo took over La Roda CF still in the third level, being relieved from his duties the following 25 March, after winning only eight of 31 matches. On 3 February 2016, after more than two years without a club, he was named FC Cartagena manager.

On 28 April 2016, Monteagudo renewed his contract for a further campaign. In 2017–18, he led the club to the play-offs but missed out promotion, and subsequently terminated his contract on 3 July 2018.

On 10 September 2018, Monteagudo moved abroad for the first time in his career, after being appointed manager of Superleague Greece side Apollon Smyrni FC, but was dismissed the following 2 October. Late in the month, he replaced sacked Javi López at the helm of second division side CD Lugo, but was himself dismissed the following 20 April.

On 1 July 2019, Monteagudo was hired for two seasons at Recreativo de Huelva in the third tier. The following 11 February he was dismissed, with the team in 13th and closer in points to the relegation zone than the promotion play-offs.

Managerial statistics

References

External links

1974 births
Living people
Sportspeople from the Province of Albacete
Spanish footballers
Footballers from Castilla–La Mancha
Association football midfielders
La Liga players
Segunda División players
Segunda División B players
Atlético Albacete players
Albacete Balompié players
CE L'Hospitalet players
Recreativo de Huelva players
CP Mérida footballers
Real Murcia players
UD Las Palmas players
Algeciras CF footballers
Xerez CD footballers
CD Numancia players
UD Vecindario players
Lucena CF players
Spanish football managers
Segunda División managers
Segunda División B managers
Cultural Leonesa managers
CD Badajoz managers
Cádiz CF managers
La Roda CF managers
FC Cartagena managers
CD Lugo managers
Recreativo de Huelva managers
Super League Greece managers
Apollon Smyrnis F.C. managers
Spanish expatriate football managers
Spanish expatriate sportspeople in Greece
Expatriate football managers in Greece